Grande Prairie—Mackenzie is a federal electoral district in northwestern Alberta, created in 2012 from the Peace River district. It contains the western half of Alberta's Peace region, including the city of Grande Prairie (where more than half its residents live) and stretching to the border with the Northwest Territories. It is impossible to traverse the district by road without leaving it, as the section of the Peace River contained within has no bridges or ferries.

The riding was named Grande Prairie in the commission's initial report, but original plans for a much smaller riding were abandoned in the interest of keeping Peace River—Westlock more compact. The new name thus reflects the inclusion of Mackenzie County.

Members of Parliament

This riding has elected the following members of the House of Commons of Canada:

Election results

References

Alberta federal electoral districts
Grande Prairie